Jessica Michele Kiper (born February 22, 1979) is an American actress, singer, and model, best known as a contestant from Survivor: Gabon where she placed third. She was more commonly known to the viewing audience during her run on Survivor by the nickname "Sugar". She returned to Survivor to compete on the show's 20th season, Survivor: Heroes vs. Villains, as part of the Heroes tribe, and was the first to be eliminated.

Early life
Kiper was born in Florida, and has lived in Rhode Island, Baton Rouge, San Francisco and Los Angeles. Her acting career began at a young age with one of her first major jobs as Amber on NBC's For Your Love. During her appearances on Celebrity Rehab, which documented her recovery from addiction, Kiper indicated that her sister Rena was her "closest sister", and that they also have a younger brother.

Survivor

Gabon
Kiper competed on the reality television show Survivor: Gabon, the seventeenth season of Survivor, which began airing on September 25, 2008. She was referred to throughout the season by her nickname "Sugar."

Kiper found the Hidden Immunity Idol very soon after arriving on Exile Island, beating the late lawyer Dan Kay who got the same opportunity the previous episode, and she played it during Episode 12 to save fellow contestant Matty Whitmore, thus negating two votes cast against him and ensuring the elimination of athlete Crystal Cox. She ended the series in third place, losing to teacher Robert Crowley and hairdresser Susie Smith. She was also the second choice for the 'Sprint Survivor of the Season' award, losing again to winner Crowley.

Kiper also holds a unique Survivor distinction of reaching the Gabon final with no votes ever cast against her, but also not receiving any votes to win.  Thus, she never once had her name written down during the run of the game at Gabon.

Survivor host Jeff Probst commented on Kiper, saying, "She is in an excellent spot to make it to the final vote. I'll give her credit. She has done a very good job of staying in this game and staying out of the way. She's survived a record number of days on Exile, she handled the power of the immunity idol beautifully, and she has earned her right to be in the final five."

Heroes vs. Villains
Kiper was a contestant in the 20th season of Survivor, entitled Survivor: Heroes vs. Villains. She was a member of the Heroes tribe. She was the first to be voted out, after being perceived as weak, and her emotions and flirtatious behavior irritating her tribemates. She finished the season in 20th place.

Personal life
Kiper currently lives in Los Angeles with her husband, photographer Nicholas Critelli, and daughter. She has five siblings: three older sisters and one older brother on her dad's side and one younger brother on her mom's side. She has fourteen nieces and nephews and believes family to be one of the most important things in life. She grew up with a special bond to her father, being his youngest child.

Filmography

Film

Television series

Video games

References

External links
 Jessica Kiper biography for Survivor: Gabon at CBS.com
 
 Jessica "Sugar" Kiper podcast interview
 Jessica "Sugar" Kiper Podcast 2019 Interview
 

1979 births
American film actresses
American television actresses
Living people
Survivor (American TV series) contestants
20th-century American actresses
21st-century American actresses
Actresses from Baton Rouge, Louisiana